In mathematics, p-adic cohomology means a cohomology theory for varieties of characteristic p whose values are modules over a ring of p-adic integers. Examples (in roughly historical order) include:

 Serre's Witt vector cohomology
 Monsky–Washnitzer cohomology
 Infinitesimal cohomology
 Crystalline cohomology
 Rigid cohomology

See also

p-adic Hodge theory
Étale cohomology, taking values over a ring of l-adic integers for l≠p

Arithmetic geometry
Cohomology theories